Ronald Alan Masak (July 1, 1936 – October 20, 2022) was an American actor best known for playing the recurring role of Sheriff Mort Metzger of Cabot Cove in the CBS mystery series Murder, She Wrote starring Angela Lansbury, who predeceased him by only 9 days. He's also known for his other television roles and his performances in films including Ice Station Zebra (1968), Tora! Tora! Tora! (1970), and Harper Valley PTA (1978).

Early life 
Masak was born in Chicago to Floyd Louis Masak and Mildred Alice (Rudy) Masak. His mother was of Irish descent and his father of 
Czech Bohemian descent. His paternal great-grandfather, Karel Masák (1861-1899), was an immigrant from Zvěrkovice near Týn nad Vltavou.

Career

Early Career 
He began working as a stage performer, and mostly was involved in theater until transitioning to film and television becoming a familiar character actor.

The Army provided Masak with a platform to display his all-around talents for performing, writing, and directing. In 1960-61, he toured the world doing vocal impressions in the all-Army show entitled "Rolling Along".

Television
Masak's early television appears includes roles on The Twilight Zone, Get Smart, The Monkees, I Dream of Jeannie, Bewitched, and The Mary Tyler Moore Show. From 1970 to 1973 he appeared in the ABC anthology comedy series Love, American Style. He then starred in another ABC series, Love Thy Neighbor (1973). He then earned roles in the NBC crime series Police Story (1975-1978), and in the ABC sitcom Webster (1983-1989).

Masak's first screen role was as the Harmonica Man in "The Purple Testament", an episode of The Twilight Zone in 1960. He appeared as "Mike the boxer" on The Flying Nun, season 1, episode 26 ("Where There's a Will"), which first aired March 13, 1968. He appeared as "Officer #2" on Bewitched, Season 7, Episode 4 ("Samantha's Hot Bedwarmer"), first aired on October 15, 1970, he also appeared in season 5 episode 25 as an ice cream shop manager which aired in 1969, (“Samantha’s Power Failure), and in “Irving Bates, Sr.” in Season 6, Episode 23 (“Just a Kid Again”).

In addition to two guest appearances on the sitcom I Dream of Jeannie, he worked again with "Jeannie" co-star Larry Hagman in an episode of the crime series The Rockford Files.

Masak had a guest appearance as Beauregard Jackson in the episode "Hurricane" on Land of the Lost. He appeared in the second season of Barney Miller episode of "The Horse Thief" as officer Shriker and was a guest star in the "Welcome Home, Vince" episode of The Feather and Father Gang in 1977 and in the episode "The Two-Million-Dollar Stowaway" of The Eddie Capra Mysteries in 1978. In 1981, he guest starred on the Magnum, P.I. episode "Skin Deep". He also guest starred on an episode of Quincy, M.E..

Masak was perhaps best known for a recurring role on Murder, She Wrote as the Cadillac convertible-driving Sheriff, Mort Metzger of Cabot Cove, taking over for Tom Bosley's Sheriff Amos Tupper, a role which he played from 1988 to 1996. Masak did make appearances as two other characters in the series, in "Footnote to Murder" as Lt. Lyle Meyer and in "No Accounting for Murder" as Marty Giles. During this time, he also guest starred on various shows such as Rockford Files, Quincy M.E., Magnum P.I., and Diff'rent Strokes.  He died just nine days after the passing of the show's main star, Angela Lansbury.  

In the 1980s and early 1990s, he was dubbed "The King of Commercials" for his many commercials, including voice-over work, most notably for a Vlasic pickles ad. From 1982 to 1983, he voiced "Meatballs" on the CBS cartoon series Meatballs & Spaghetti. He did the voice for Veteran Holt in the video game Medal of Honor: European Assault.

In 1990, Masak was a panelist on the revival of the television game show, To Tell the Truth, and appeared on several other game shows as a panelist (including Match Game, Password Plus, and Super Password). Masak appeared as Eddie Fenelle, a taxi driver, in the Columbo episode Ashes to Ashes (1998).

Film
In 1968, he appeared alongside Vince Lombardi in the short film, Second Effort. In the same year he had a supporting role in the submarine action film Ice Station Zebra. He also had a role in the film Harper Valley PTA with his "Jeannie" co-star Barbara Eden.

Personal life and death
Masak married Kay Knebes in September 1961; together they had six children. He was also the first cousin of actor Michael Gross of Family Ties and former Saturday Night Live cast member Mary Gross.

Masak was honorary sheriff of Tarzana, California, for 35 years.

On October 20, 2022, Masak died in Thousand Oaks, California, at the age of 86.

Selected filmography

References

External links
 
 

1936 births
2022 deaths
American male television actors
American male stage actors
Male actors from Chicago
20th-century American male actors
21st-century American male actors
American male film actors
United States Army soldiers
American people of Czech descent
Military personnel from Chicago